Scatologia may refer to:

 Scatology, the study of feces
 Telephone scatologia, making obscene telephone calls